The UCLA School of the Arts and Architecture (UCLA Arts) is a professional school at the University of California, Los Angeles.  Through its four degree-granting departments, it provides a range of course offerings and programs. Additionally, there are eight centers located within the school.

History
In 1919, UCLA's leadership demonstrated an early commitment to offer students opportunities to explore the arts by the establishment of an art gallery and a music department. But in 1939 the College of Applied Arts was founded with the addition of a Department of Art, followed by the College of Fine Arts in 1960, with degrees available in art, dance, music, and theater arts.

Following academic restructuring in the late 1980s, the UC Regents formally approved the establishment of two schools: the School of the Arts and the School of Theater, Film and Television. In 1994 architecture and urban design joined the School of the Arts, which became the School of the Arts and Architecture (UCLA Arts).

Brett Steele was appointed dean of the School of the Arts and Architecture in 2017.

Departments

 Architecture and Urban Design
 Art
 Design Media Arts
 World Arts and Cultures/Dance

Facilities

Production, Research, and Exhibition Units
 Art & Global Health Center
 Art | Sci Center
 Center for Intercultural Performance
 Experiential Technologies Center
 Grunwald Center for the Graphic Arts
 New Wight Gallery

Facilities
 Eli and Edythe Broad Art Center (comprising the Design Media Arts and Art departments)
 Perloff Hall (comprising the departments of Architecture and Urban Planning)
 Glorya Kaufman Hall (consisting of the World Arts and Cultures department)

Institutions

Three public arts institutions, including a major performing arts program (CAP UCLA), are located within the School of the Arts and Architecture. These institutions offer access to leading anthropological, historical and contemporary visual arts exhibitions and collections, as well as presentations by performing artists.

 Hammer Museum
 Fowler Museum at UCLA
 UCLA Center for the Art of Performance (CAP UCLA)

Notable faculty
 Rebecca Allen, Professor of Design Media Arts
 Casey Reas, Professor of Design Media Arts
 Victoria Vesna, Professor of Design Media Arts
 Jennifer Steinkamp, Professor of Design Media Arts
 Erkki Huhtamo, Professor of Design Media Arts
 Peter Lunenfeld, Professor of Design Media Arts
 Christian Moeller, Professor of Design Media Arts
 Eddo Stern, Professor of Design Media Arts
 Peter Sellars, MacArthur Fellowship (1983), Distinguished Professor of world arts and cultures
 Catherine Opie, Professor of Photography
 Andrea Fraser, Professor of Interdisciplinary Studio and Department of Art Chair
 Barbara Kruger, Distinguished Professor of New Genres
 Lari Pittman, Distinguished Professor of Painting
 Neil Denari, Professor of Architecture
 Thom Mayne, Professor of Architecture
 Sylvia Lavin, Professor of Architecture
 Greg Lynn, Professor of Architecture
Mary Kelly,  former Professor of Interdisciplinary Studio Art
John Baldessari, former Professor of Art
Charles Ray, former Professor of Art
Chris Burden, former Professor of Art
Mike Kelley, former Professor of Art
Paul McCarthy, former Professor of Art
Nancy Rubins, former Professor of Art

Notable alumni
Full List

References

External links
UCLA School of the Arts and Architecture

Arts and Architecture
Architecture schools in California
Art schools in California
Educational institutions established in 1939
1939 establishments in California
Arts organizations established in 1939